Margaret Florence Herrick (September 27, 1902June 21, 1976), also known professionally as Margaret Gledhill, was an American librarian and the Executive Director of the Academy of Motion Picture Arts and Sciences. In 1971, the Academy's library was named the Margaret Herrick Library in her honor.

Early life 
She was born Margaret Buck in Spokane, Washington, to Nathan K. Buck, an attorney, and Adda M. Buck (née Morie).

In 1929, Herrick graduated from the University of Washington with a degree in library science.

Career 
In 1929, Herrick became head librarian at the Yakima Public Library in Yakima, Washington. She moved to Hollywood, California, with her husband and became the Academy's first librarian. She served in that capacity until 1943, during the war, when she became the interim executive director of the Academy, replacing her husband. In 1945, she was offered the Executive Director position permanently and held that position until her retirement in January 1971.

In the mid-1960s, Herrick went on international tours to promote the tenth anniversary of the Oscar for Best Foreign Language Film. Between 1963 and 1968, she visited many international film institutions.

The Academy's extensive library in Beverly Hills, California, of material on films is named in her honor.

Oscar moniker 
Herrick is generally credited with naming the Academy Award an "Oscar", declaring the statuettes "looked just like my Uncle Oscar". However, others, including Academy President Bette Davis and Hollywood gossip columnist Sidney Skolsky, have claimed they invented the name.

Bette Davis said that the statue reminded her of her husband Harmon Nelson's derrière. Nelson's middle name was Oscar. Though Davis ended up revoking this honor.

Columnist Sidney Skolsky, who had a syndicated column for over 50 years, referred to the nickname, "Oscar," in his March 17, 1934, column, which is believed to be the first time the award was called the Oscar in print.

Personal life 
In 1931, Herrick married Donald Gledhill, an assistant to the executive secretary of the Academy. She and Gledhill divorced in 1945. She married Philip A. Herrick in 1946, and continued to use his name professionally following their divorce in 1951.

On June 21, 1976, Herrick died at the Motion Picture & Television Country House and Hospital in Woodland Hills, California, after a lengthy illness.

See also 
 Margaret Herrick Library
 Academy of Motion Picture Arts and Sciences

Works and publications

References

Further reading 

 
 
 
 
   Originally presented as the author's thesis, University of Southern California, Arno Press Cinema Program, 1966.

External links 
 Margaret Herrick Library

1902 births
1976 deaths
American librarians
People from Spokane, Washington
American women librarians
20th-century American women